Rareș Cuzdriorean (Greek: Ράρες Κουζδριόρεαν, born 31 July 1986) is a Romanian professional tennis player with Cypriot citizenship. He qualified to play for the Cyprus Davis Cup team after defeating fellow Cypriot Christopher Koutrouzas 6–1, 6–4 in a playoff tournament held in Limassol.

References

External links
 
 
 
 coretennis.net profile

Cypriot male tennis players
Romanian emigrants to Cyprus
Sportspeople from Limassol
Sportspeople from Satu Mare
1986 births
Living people